Sam Kasten (1865 or 21 April 1869 – 4 March 1953) was a comic actor in Yiddish Theater. A 1925 New York Times article singled out his and Moony Weisenfreund's performances at the People's Theater as among the highlights of that year's Yiddish theater season, describing them as second only to Ludwig Satz.

He died in New York on 4 March 1953.

References

Jewish American male actors
Yiddish theatre performers
1865 births
1953 deaths